Yalahatan, or Awaiya, is an Austronesian language spoken on Seram Island (Indonesia) in two villages, Yalahatan and Haruru.

References

Central Maluku languages
Languages of Indonesia
Seram Island